Campyloneurum phyllitidis, commonly known as the long strap fern, is a species of fern in the family Polypodiaceae.

Distribution
Campyloneurum phyllitidis is found in North, Central, and South America: from Florida, the Caribbean, and southeastern Mexico in the north; to tropical Peru and Brazil, and Paraguay in the south.

Other countries it is native to include the Southeastern United States, Cuba, Costa Rica, Bolivia, and Venezuela. It is also present in Florida, Puerto Rico, Hawaii and the Virgin Islands. The fern is common on Barro Colorado Island of Panama.

Description
Campyloneurum phyllitidis is an epiphyte, growing on other plants; generally the fern is found growing in the canopies of trees.

It has a relatively large rhizome from which many fine rootlets covered in dark reddish-brown scales grow.

The sori are round and small, occurring in on both sides of lateral veins of the leaves.

It is known to grow as an epiphyte on Platypodium elegans, Ceiba pentandra, Tabebuia guayacan, Anacardium excelsum, Socratea exorrhiza, Marila laxiflora and  Perebea xanthochyma.

Uses
Campyloneurum phyllitidis is cultivated as an ornamental plant, and is the most common species of Campyloneurum found in cultivation. The fern grows well in well-drained soil under medium levels of light. It needs to be protected from slugs and snails.

Campyloneurum phyllitidis was grown in England during the Victorian era, when ferns were particularly popular (the phenomenon known as pteridomania). The fern was described by an author of the time, Shirley Hibberd, as being "very distinct" and that it formed a "striking object when grown well".

See also

References

External links
USDA Plants Profile for Campyloneurum phyllitidis (long strapfern)

phyllitidis
Ferns of the Americas
Flora of the Caribbean
Ferns of Mexico
Ferns of the United States
Flora of Central America
Flora of northern South America
Flora of western South America
Ferns of Brazil
Flora of Florida
Flora of Panama
Epiphytes
Plants described in 1753
Taxa named by Carl Linnaeus
Taxa named by Carl Borivoj Presl
Garden plants of North America
Garden plants of South America
House plants
Flora without expected TNC conservation status